Marc Paul (born 29 May 1968) is a United Kingdom-based mentalist and magician.

Paul starred in his own TV series Mind Games on the short-lived UK cable channel L!ve TV. Other television credits include:

Paul Daniels' Secrets (BBC1)
Michael Parkinson Show (BBC1)
Equinox – Secrets of the Psychics (Channel 4)
Paranormal World (ITV1)
Mysteries (BBC1)
Undercover Magic (Sky One)
Magic (BBC2)
Heroes of Magic (Channel 4)
Stuff the White Rabbit (BBC2)
Secrets (BBC1)
Trick on Two (BBC2)
Top of the Pops (BBC1)
Staggered (1994 Rank Films)

References

External links

TVmagic.co.uk
Magic Week: Marc Paul

British magicians
1968 births
Living people
Mentalists